Dantoni may refer to:
D'Antoni, Italian surname

See also
D'Antonio, Italian surname